Uttamrao Nathuji Dhikale (10 February 1940 – 2015) was a member of the 13th Lok Sabha of India. He represented the Nashik constituency of Maharashtra from Shivsena. He later joined Maharashtra Navnirman Sena and was a member of Maharashtra Legislative Assembly from Nashik East Constituency.
His son Rahul Uttamrao Dhikale is currently a Member of legislative Assembly ( Bharatiya Janata Party) from Nashik East constituency. party.

Early life 
Uttamrao Dhikale was born on 10 February 1940 in Vinchur. He completed his education is Bachelor in Law(LLB) from Pune University. At the age of 27, Uttamrao Dhikale becomes youngest councilor in Nashik Municipal Corporation. He has made a great contribution to the cooperative movement in Nashik district.

Positions held 

 Councilor  in Nashik Municipal Corporation (1967-1980)
 Genearal Secretary of Nashik District Congress Committee (1980)
 Director Nashik District Central Co-opeartive Bank (1974-2013)
 Chairman Nashik District Central Co-opeartive Bank (1974-1975, 1982-1983, 2007–2008)
 Mayor of Nashik Municipality (1967-1968)
 Mayor Nashik Municipal Corporation (1995-1996)
 Member of Parliament in the Lok Sabha (1999-2004)
 Member of Committe on Government Assurances (1999-2000)
 Member of Consultative Committee, Ministry of Agriculture (2000-2004)
 Member of Legislative Assembly Maharashtra (2009-2014)

References

India MPs 1999–2004
1938 births
2015 deaths
Indian National Congress politicians from Maharashtra
Maharashtra Navnirman Sena politicians
Shiv Sena politicians
Lok Sabha members from Maharashtra
People from Nashik
Maharashtra MLAs 2009–2014